Chandra Davis (born January 2, 1978 in Detroit, Michigan), a.k.a. London Charles and Deelishis, is an American model and former reality show contestant. She is best known as the winner of VH1's hit reality TV show Flavor of Love 2.

Flavor of Love 2

Davis was a contestant on the second season of VH1's Flavor of Love (aged 28). She went on to win the competition when Flavor Flav chose her over Tiffany 'New York' Pollard, who returned after previously named the runner-up on the show's first season.

After Flavor of Love
After FOL, Davis announced she was no longer dating Flav, via a VH1 special, Where Are They Now: Reality Stars.

Davis has also been modeling. She models for Eye Candy modeling and made an appearance in a music video in Paul Wall's "Break 'Em Off" featuring Lil Keke and BET's "Rip the Runway". Chandra also appeared in Busta Rhymes's video for "Touch It Remix". Davis appeared on the cover of Smooth magazine in April 2007, and appeared on the cover of Black Men magazine in September 2007. In 2008, she was a lollipop girl in Lil Wayne's "Lollipop" music video. She also appeared on BET's Hip-Hop vs America among other things. She also hosted Dance Party, a local TV show on WADL.

Davis was also a contestant on the canceled third season of I Love Money, where she was disqualified on the show's fourth episode for physically assaulting another cast member, coming in on fourteenth place.

Davis appeared as a cameo on the VH1 hit reality series, Love & Hip Hop: Atlanta on the fifth-season finale in 2016.

Musical career
Davis has also launched a music career, releasing her debut single and accompanying music video, "Rumpshaker". She plans to release an album, to be called "Love, Deelishis".   Davis called her new single "Groove with You", an upbeat song that allows the listener to select the type of dance moves they want to do with the song". Davis also released a song via MySpace titled "The Movement", which is a response to the election of 2008 United States President, Barack Obama. Deelishis released another single titled "Set It Off", announcing it on MySpace and Twitter.

Personal Life
Chandra's niece, pre-medicine student Arielle Anderson, was killed during the 2023 mass shooting at Michigan State University.

Discography

Singles
 "Rumpshaker" (2007)
 "The Movement" (2009)
 "Set It Off" (2010)

See also
Hip hop models

References

1978 births
Living people
Actresses from Detroit
African-American female models
Female models from Michigan
African-American models
African-American women singer-songwriters
Flavor of Love
Alabama State University alumni
Hip hop models
Participants in American reality television series
Reality show winners
Singers from Detroit
21st-century American singers
21st-century American women singers
21st-century African-American women singers
20th-century African-American people
Singer-songwriters from Michigan
20th-century African-American women